Sophie Nenadovic (born 8 April 1998) is an Australian football (soccer) player, who currently plays for Newcastle Jets in the Australian W-League. She was first selected in the Young Matilda's side at the age of 15.

Career
At the age of 15, Nenadovic played her debut game in the W-league for Newcastle Jets in 2013. She was subbed in with 15 minutes remaining against Sydney FC.
Later in the 2013/2014 season, she scored her first W-league goal against Perth Glory.

References

External links
 Newcastle Jets player profile

Living people
1998 births
Australian women's soccer players
Newcastle Jets FC (A-League Women) players
Women's association football defenders